Poor But Honest (Mexican:Pobre, pero honrada!) is a 1973 Mexican comedy film directed by Fernando Cortés and starring María Elena Velasco, Fernando Soler and Norma Lazareno. It was made at the Estudios América. It was one of a series of films featuring Velasco as the comic character La India María.

Cast
 María Elena Velasco as María  
 Fernando Soler as Don Abundio  
 Norma Lazareno as Marcela  
 Ángel Garasa as Padre Bonifacio  
 Adalberto Rodriguez 
 José Ángel Espinoza as Chimino  
 Raúl Meraz as Ayundante de don Abundio  
 Héctor Herrera 
 Julián de Meriche as Doctor Villegas  
 Alicia del Lago as Enamorada de don Abundio  
 Armando Arriola as Viejito  
 Elena Contla as Criada de don Abundio  
 Jorge Fegán 
 Jaime Manterola 
 Alfonso Zayas as Borracho  
 Patricia Olmos 
 Pura Vargas 
 Manuel Dondé
 Armando Acosta 
 Fernando Cortés 
 José Luis Jiménez

References

Bibliography 
 Mora, Carl J. Mexican Cinema: Reflections of a Society, 1896-2004. McFarland & Co, 2005.

External links 
 

1973 films
1973 comedy films
Mexican comedy films
1970s Spanish-language films
Films directed by Fernando Cortés
1970s Mexican films